Mirror polydactyly-vertebral segmentation-limb defects syndrome is a very rare genetic disorder which is characterized by bilateral symmetrical (mirror) polydactyly, vertebral anomalies and diverse limb deficiencies. It has been described in four un-related patients from Spain, which were brought to medical attention by a program called Spanish Collaborative Study of Congenital Malformations.

References

Genetic diseases and disorders